The 1962 Sun Bowl was a college football postseason bowl game between the Ohio Bobcats and the West Texas State Buffaloes.

Background
West Texas State (now known as West Texas A&M) was selected as an independent and was third in scoring with 29.7 points per game and fifth in rushing with 255.5 yards per game. Ohio was selected to represent as a member of the Mid-America Athletic Conference in their first ever bowl game. This was the final Sun Bowl played at Kidd Field.

Game summary
Jim McKee kicked a 52-yard field goal to put the Bobcats ahead early but they trailed at the half 7-3 after a touchdown pass from Jim Dawson to Jerry Don Logan. In the third quarter, Skip Hoovler intercepted a pass and ran it back 91 yards for a touchdown, which still stands as the longest interception return in the Sun Bowl. Bob Babbitt completed a pass to Ken Smith for the two-point conversion to give Ohio an 11-7 lead. Ohio added in a field goal in the 4th to make it 14-7 late in the game. West Texas scored on a Dave “Hoot” Gibson pass to Jerry Richardson, who went 32 yards for the score. The game came down to a two-point conversion attempt by the Buffaloes. Dawson's pass to Jim Ostrander was successful, and the Buffaloes won. Logan recorded six tackles and caught a touchdown pass and was named MVP. Pete Pedro rushed for 105 yards on 14 carries for the Buffaloes.

Aftermath
Ohio would win the MAC title the following year, but wasn't invited to a bowl game. The Buffaloes made just one more bowl game, the Junior Rose Bowl in 1967.

References

Sun Bowl
Sun Bowl
Ohio Bobcats football bowl games
West Texas A&M Buffaloes football bowl games
Sun Bowl
December 1962 sports events in the United States